Neisser S. Bent Vázquez (born August 7, 1976 in Nueva Gerona, Isla de la Juventud) is a former international backstroke swimmer from Cuba, who swam at the 1996 and 2000 Olympics. At the '96 Games, he won the bronze medal in the 100 m backstroke, just behind fellow countryman Rodolfo Falcón. These are the only Olympic medals that Cuba has ever won in swimming.

At the 1998 Central American and Caribbean Games, he broke the Championship Record in the 200 backstroke (2:01.53). This record stood until the 2006 Games where it was bettered by Barbados' Nick Neckles.

References

External links
 
 
 Enfinity Aquatic Club - Neisser Bent 

1976 births
Living people
Cuban male swimmers
Male backstroke swimmers
Swimmers at the 1995 Pan American Games
Swimmers at the 1996 Summer Olympics
Swimmers at the 1999 Pan American Games
Swimmers at the 2000 Summer Olympics
Swimmers at the 2003 Pan American Games
People from Nueva Gerona
Olympic swimmers of Cuba
Olympic bronze medalists for Cuba
Olympic bronze medalists in swimming
Medalists at the FINA World Swimming Championships (25 m)
Medalists at the 1996 Summer Olympics
Universiade medalists in swimming
Central American and Caribbean Games gold medalists for Cuba
Competitors at the 1998 Central American and Caribbean Games
Universiade gold medalists for Cuba
Universiade silver medalists for Cuba
Central American and Caribbean Games medalists in swimming
Medalists at the 1997 Summer Universiade
Pan American Games competitors for Cuba
20th-century Cuban people
21st-century Cuban people
Cuban sports coaches
Swimming coaches